Henry-Russell Hitchcock (1903–1987) was an American architectural historian, and for many years a professor at Smith College and New York University. His writings helped to define the characteristics of modernist architecture.

Early life
Henry-Russell Hitchcock Jr. was born in Boston, Massachusetts, on June 3, 1903, the son of Dr. Henry Russell Hitchcock, a physician and graduate of the Harvard Medical School, class of 1890, and his wife, Alice Davis. The hyphenation of the son's given names was probably an affectation. He was educated at Middlesex School and Harvard University, receiving his A.B. in 1924 and his M.A. in 1927.

Educator
Hitchcock taught at a number of colleges and universities, but primarily at Smith College (where he was also Director of the Smith College Museum of Art from 1949 to 1955).  In 1968 he moved to New York City and thereafter taught at the Institute of Fine Arts, New York University. He also taught at Wesleyan University, Massachusetts Institute of Technology, Yale University, Harvard University, and Cambridge University.

While teaching at Wesleyan University in the 1930s, Hitchcock curated an exhibition of Berenice Abbott's photographs of urban vernacular American architecture.

Author and historian
Over the course of Hitchcock's career, he wrote more than a dozen books on architecture.  His Architecture: Nineteenth and Twentieth Centuries (1958) is an exhaustive study of more than 150 years of architecture that was widely used as a textbook in architectural history courses from the 1960s to the 1980s, and is still a useful reference today.

In the early 1930s, at the request of Alfred Barr, the director of the Museum of Modern Art, Hitchcock collaborated with Philip Johnson and Lewis Mumford on the museum's exhibition "Modern Architecture: International Exhibition" (1932). The exhibition introduced the European International Style of architecture to an American audience. Hitchcock and Johnson co-authored the book The International Style: Architecture Since 1922, published simultaneously with the exhibit.

Four years later Hitchcock's book, The Architecture of H. H. Richardson and His Times (1936) brought the career of American architect Henry Hobson Richardson out of obscurity while also arguing that the distant roots of European Modernism were actually to be found in the United States.  Hitchcock's In the Nature of Materials (1942) continued to emphasize the American roots of Modern architecture, in this case by focusing on the career of Frank Lloyd Wright.

In 1948, Hitchcock wrote an essay for the exhibition catalogue Painting toward architecture: The Miller Company Collection of Abstract Art).

Hitchcock focused primarily on the formal aspects of design and he regarded the individual architect as the chief determinant in architectural history.  Hitchcock's work tended to diminish the role of broader social forces.  He has sometimes been criticized for this "great man" or "genealogical" approach.

Victorian Society
Hitchcock was a founding member of the Victorian Society in Great Britain and an early president of the Victorian Society in America. One of that Society's book awards is the Henry-Russell Hitchcock Award. The Alice Davis Hitchcock Award, awarded by both the Society of Architectural Historians and the Society of Architectural Historians of Great Britain (SAHGB), is named after Hitchcock's mother.

Personal life
According to the historian Douglass Shand-Tucci, Hitchcock was gay, and was one of several gay men active in the arts and humanities to emerge from Harvard.

Hitchcock died of cancer at age 83.

Written works
 Hitchcock, Henry Russell, American Architectural Books: A List of Books, Portfolios, and Pamphlets on Architecture and Related Subjects published in America before 1895, University of Minnesota Press, Minneapolis 1962
 Hitchcock, Henry-Russell, Architecture: Nineteenth and Twentieth Centuries, Penguin Books, Baltimore 1958;  second ed. 1963;  fourth ed. Penguin Books, Harmondsworth England, and New York 1977, 
 Hitchcock, Henry-Russell, The Architecture of H. H. Richardson and His Times, Museum of Modern Art, New York 1936;  second ed. Archon Books, Hampden CT 1961;  MIT Press, Cambridge MA 1966 [paperback]
 Hitchcock, Henry-Russell, Boston Architecture, 1637-1954; including Other Communities within Easy Driving Distance, Reinhold Pub. Corp., New York 1954.
 Hitchcock, Henry Russell, and Drexler, Arthur, editors, Built in USA: Post-war Architecture, Museum of Modern Art (Simon & Schuster), New York 1952.
 Hitchcock, Henry Russell, Early Victorian architecture in Britain, Yale University Press, New Haven 1954
 Hitchcock, Henry-Russell, German Renaissance Architecture, Princeton University Press, Princeton NJ 1981, 
 Hitchcock, Henry-Russell, In the Nature of Materials, 1887-1941: The Buildings of Frank Lloyd Wright, Duell, Sloan and Pearce, New York 1942;  Da Capo Press, New York 1975 (paperback), 
 Hitchcock, Henry-Russell, and Johnson, Philip C., The International Style: Architecture since 1922, W. W. Norton & Company, New York 1932, second edition 1966;  reprint of 1932 edition 1996, 
 Hitchcock, Henry Russell, Latin American Architecture since 1945, Museum of Modern Art, New York 1955
 Hitchcock, Henry-Russell, Modern Architecture in England, Museum of Modern Art, New York 1937
 Hitchcock, Henry-Russell, Modern Architecture: Romanticism and Reintegration, Payson & Clarke Ltd., New York 1929
 Hitchcock, Henry-Russell, and others, The Rise of an American Architecture,  Praeger in association with the Metropolitan Museum of Art, New York 1970.
 Hitchcock, Henry-Russell, Rococo Architecture in Southern Germany, Phaidon, London 1968, 
 Hitchcock, Henry-Russell, and Seale, William, Temples of Democracy: The State Capitols of the U.S.A., Harcourt Brace Jovanovich, New York 1976,

References

 Lipstadt, Hélène, "Celebrating the Centenaries of Sir John Summerson and Henry-Russell Hitchcock: Finding a Historiography for the Architect-historian", The Journal of Architecture, 10/1 February 2005, pages 43–61.
 Searing, Helen, editor, In Search of Modern Architecture: A Tribute to Henry-Russell Hitchcock, Architectural History Foundation, New York; MIT Press, Cambridge MA 1982, 
 Lee Sorensen, editor, Hitchcock, Henry-Russell, Dictionary of Art Historians, arthistorians.info.  Retrieved May 28, 2016. 
 Paul Goldberger, Honoring an Inspirational Historian, New York Times, March 20, 1983. Accessed May 28, 2016

External links
  "Architecture Nineteenth And Twentieth Centuries". 1958 edition at archive.org 
 Book prologue that explores the nature of Hitchcock's and Johnson's collaboration and travels in Europe
 Society of Architectural Historians Publication Awards
 Victorian Society in America Book Awards
 Henry-Russell Hitchcock papers, circa 1500-1970. Held by the Department of Drawings & Archives, Avery Architectural & Fine Arts Library, Columbia University.

1903 births
1987 deaths
American art historians
American architecture writers
American architectural historians
Deaths from cancer
Harvard University alumni
New York University faculty
Smith College faculty
Wesleyan University faculty
Massachusetts Institute of Technology faculty
Yale University faculty
LGBT people from Massachusetts
American LGBT writers
20th-century American historians
Middlesex School alumni
20th-century American male writers
American male non-fiction writers
20th-century American LGBT people